Ncell Women's National Football Championship is a major women's football knockout tournament in Nepal. The tournament is sponsored by the Nepal-based telecommunications company Ncell.

Venue
The tournament is played at the Simara Stadium, Bara and Chandranigahapur, Rautahat before the start of the league season.

Past winners

Performance by Clubs

See more
Ncell Cup
Ncell Football

References

External links

 
Football competitions in Nepal
1
Women's association football competitions in Asia
2012 establishments in Nepal